The Falkland Islands general election of 1997 was held on Thursday 9 October 1997 to elect members to the Legislative Council. Eight Councillors were elected through universal suffrage using block voting, five from the Stanley constituency and three from the Camp constituency.

It was the first election to take place after a constitutional amendment came into force, which redistributed the representation in the constituencies, giving an additional seat to Stanley and removing one from Camp. The amendment also modified voter eligibility.

Results
Candidates in bold were elected.  Candidates in italic were incumbents.

Stanley constituency

Camp constituency

References

1997 elections in South America
General election
1997
Non-partisan elections
1997 elections in British Overseas Territories
October 1997 events in South America